The Boylston Street subway is a light rail tunnel which lies primarily under Boylston Street in Boston, Massachusetts. In operation since 1914, it now carries all four branches of the MBTA Green Line from Kenmore Square under the Back Bay into downtown Boston, where it joins with the older Tremont Street subway.

Route
The eastern end of the tunnel is at the Tremont Street subway, just west of Boylston station near the intersection of Boylston Street and Tremont Street next to Boston Common. It then runs westward under Boylston Street; Arlington station is located at Arlington Street, and Copley station is at Dartmouth Street in Copley Square. The Huntington Avenue subway branches off to the south just to the west of Copley. The main line continues west under Boylston Street; at Hereford Street, it curves northward into Hynes Convention Center station at Massachusetts Avenue, then runs west under Newbury Street and the Muddy River and into Kenmore station at Kenmore Square.

The depth of the tunnel varies based on street considerations and other geography. At Arlington, Hynes Convention Center, and Kenmore, the tunnel is substantially below street level, and the stations have below-ground fare mezzanines offering access to both platforms; at Copley, the tunnel is shallower, and the fare gates are at platform level, with a free crossover to reverse direction not possible. The deepest section of the tunnel is under the Muddy River, in the Fenway neighborhood of Boston.

See also
 Boylston Street Fishweir – archeological site discovered while excavating the Boylston Street subway

References

External links

Green Line (MBTA)